Taryn is a feminine name of various meanings.

Notable people
Notable people with the name include:

 Taryn Brumfitt (born ), Australian body positivity advocate, writer and filmmaker 
 Taryn Davidson (born 1991), Canadian model
 Taryn Fiebig (1972–2021), Australian opera and musical theatre soprano and cellist
 Taryn Foshee (born 1985), American beauty pageant contestant
 Taryn Heather (born 1982), Australian racing cyclist
 Taryn Hemmings (born 1986), American soccer defender
 Taryn Hosking (born 1981), South African field hockey player
 Taryn Manning (born 1978), American actress, singer-songwriter, and fashion designer
 Taryn Marler (born 1988), Australian actress
 Taryn Onofaro (born 1979), Australian television presenter
 Taryn Power (1953–2020), American actress
 Taryn Rockall (born 1977), Australian football (soccer) player
 Taryn Simon (born 1975) artist who has worked in photography, text, sculpture, and performance
 Taryn Southern (born 1986), American actress, singer, and model
 Taryn Suttie (born 1990), Canadian track and field athlete
 Taryn Swiatek (born 1981), Canadian soccer player
 Taryn Terrell (born 1985), American model, professional wrestler, ring announcer, and referee
 Taryn Thomas (born 1983), American pornographic actress, director, and model
 Taryn Woods (born 1975), Australian water polo player

References

English-language feminine given names